Bora-Bora is a commune of French Polynesia, an overseas territory of France in the Pacific Ocean. The commune is in the administrative subdivision of the Leeward Islands. Its population was 10,549 at the 2017 census.

The atoll of Tupai has no permanent population apart from some seasonal workers in the coconut plantations.

The surrounding islets include Motu Tapu, Motu Ahuna, Tevairoa, Motu Tane, Motu Mute, Motu Tufari, Motu Tehotu, Motu Pitiaau, Sofitel Motu, Motu Toopua, and Toopuaiti.

Climate
Bora-Bora has a tropical monsoon climate (Köppen climate classification Am).

Administration

The commune is in the administrative subdivision of the Leeward Islands and consists of the following associated communes:

 Anau
 Faanui
 Nunue

The administrative center of the commune is the settlement of Vaitape, on the island of Bora Bora. Gaston Tong Sang is the current mayor of Bora Bora.

References

Communes of French Polynesia